Angharad Price  is a Welsh academic and novelist. She is a recipient of the Glyndŵr Award.

Biography
Price was born in Bethel, Gwynedd, Wales, the daughter of the Welsh historian .  She graduated with a BA and DPhil in Modern Languages from Jesus College, Oxford. She teaches at Bangor University and works on Welsh prose of the modern era.  She currently lives in Caernarfon.

Price's first novel, Tania’r Tacsi, was published in 1999. Her second novel, O! Tyn y Gorchudd!, won the National Eisteddfod Prose Medal in 2002 and was named Welsh Language Book of the Year by the Welsh Arts Council at the Hay Festival in 2003. An English translation of the novel, called The Life of Rebecca Jones, was also published in 2010. Her third novel, Caersaint, was published in 2010.

In 2014, Price received the Glyndŵr Award at the Machynlleth Festival.

References

External links
 Review of the English language version of O Tyn y Gorchudd

20th-century births
Living people
20th-century Welsh novelists
21st-century Welsh novelists
20th-century Welsh women writers
21st-century Welsh women writers
21st-century Welsh writers
Welsh-language novelists
Welsh women novelists
People from Gwynedd
Alumni of Jesus College, Oxford
Academics of Bangor University
Year of birth missing (living people)